Simha Swapnam is a 1989 Indian Telugu-language crime film, produced by V. B. Rajendra Prasad under the Jagapathi Art Pictures banner and directed by V. Madhusudhana Rao. It stars Krishnam Raju, Jayasudha, Jagapathi Babu, Vani Viswanath and Shantipriya, with music composed by Chakravarthy. The film is a remake of the Hindi film Khatron Ke Khiladi (1988). This film is the debut of Jagapathi Babu as a hero, with double role performance, both the roles of Sanjay Dutt and Chunky Pandey are done by Jagapathi Babu in Telugu.

Plot
Simha Swapnam is a rebel under the veil and uproars against savage bits with capital punishment. However, outwardly he is a respectable industrialist Krishnarjun. Now he rearwards, his true self is Balaram one accustomed to a jollity life with pregnant wife Annapurna and devoted younger Sivaram. The sibling works as a truck driver for a company owned by Raghupati & Rangapati. He is being unbeknownst to their actual shadow of honorable-seeming hoodlums which Sivaram senses. Hence, they slaughter him and pin Balaram as the homicide mingling Inspector Bhujangam. Plus, they put on fire to his house where Annapurna is reported dead. Therein, Balaram freaks on blackguards and getaway by chopping their hands & feet. Annapurna has escaped from death and is sheltered by a wise Inspector Veerabhadram who she gives birth to twins Rajesh & Harish. Since the Veerabhadram couple is childless Annapurna bestows Harish on them and quits. 

Rajesh is a professional photographer and jewel burglar who surrogates for a sly smuggler Vaddikasula Varahala Rao. He is on a gravy train to recover his mother that is in trauma. Once, he is acquainted with Rangapati’s daughter Kavitha and falls for her. Harish is a sleuth who seeks to sneak upon criminals and woos for a lady doctor Sunitha. As of today, Bhujangam turned into a cracksman Bhayankar eludes cops steals precious diamonds, and is under cover of Rangapati & Rangapati. Being aware of it, Balaram moves for his vengeance, Rajesh is decreed by Varahala Rao to swipe the diamonds and Harish walks to catch hold of him. At the crime, Balaram knocks out Bhayankar deleting his veil when Rajesh accomplishes his task, secretly gains his photograph, and flees. Harish backs him and a brawl erupts but afterward, they are detected as siblings. Besides, Balaram encounters Annapurna and she too discerns him back to normal. Knowledging the facts, Rangapati & Raghupati abduct Annapurna for diamonds. At last, Balaram, Rajesh & Harish cease them. Finally, the movie ends on a happy note with the reunion of the family and Simha Swapnam surrendering before the judiciary.

Cast

Krishnam Raju as Balaram / Krishnarjun / Simha Swapnam
Jayasudha as Annapurna
Jagapati Babu as Rajesh & Harish (dual role) 
Vani Viswanath as Kavita
Shantipriya as Sunita
Gummadi as DSP Raghuram
Gollapudi Maruti Rao as Vaddikasula Varahala Rao
Ranganath as Rangapati
Giri Babu as Inspector Veerabhadram
Ahuti Prasad as Raghupati
Chalapathi Rao as Inspector Bhujangam / Bhayankar
Thyagaraju as I.G.
Ramana Murthy as Dr. Prakash
Narra Venkateswara Rao as Deen Dayal
Pradeep Shakthi as Billa
Vinod as Shishupal
Madan as Shiva Ram
Raj Varma as Kotlingam
Jaya Bhaskar as Inspector Narayan
Sarathi as Kanaka Rao 
K. K. Sarma as a priest
Anitha as Lakshmi
Sri Lakshmi
Phani
Vijayalakshmi
Shyamala

Soundtrack

Music composed by Chakravarthy. Lyrics written by Acharya Aatreya. Music released on AMC Audio Company.

References

External links

1989 films
1980s Telugu-language films
Indian crime action films
1980s masala films
Trucker films
Twins in Indian films
Films directed by V. Madhusudhana Rao
Films scored by K. Chakravarthy
Telugu remakes of Hindi films
1980s crime action films